The 2016 Latin Cup was the 28th edition of the Latin Cup, an international youth roller hockey tournament organised by the Comité Européen de Rink-Hockey. It was held in Follonica, Italy, from 24 to 26 March 2016, and won by Portugal.

Results

Standings

Matches

See also
 Roller Hockey
 CERH

References

2016 in roller hockey
2016 in Italian sport
International roller hockey competitions hosted by Italy